Warwick is a habitational given name derived from the English town of the same name. It may refer to the following people:

Warwick Abrahim (born 1990), South African cricketer
Warwick Adlam (born 1971), Australian cricketer
Warwick Anderson (born 1958), Australian medical doctor, poet, and historian
Warwick Angus (born 1969), Australian rules footballer
Warwick Ball, Australian-born archeologist
Warwick Banks (born 1939), British auto racing driver
Warwick Braithwaite (1896–1971), New Zealand-born orchestral conductor
 Warwick Brown (born 1949), Australian Formula One driver
Warwick Cairns (born 1962), British author
 Warwick Capper (born 1963), Australian Rules football player
Warwick Cathro (born 1948), Australian librarian 
Warwick Collins (1948–2013), British novelist, screenwriter, yacht designer, and evolutionary theorist
Warwick Dalton (born 1937), racing cyclist from New Zealand
 Warwick Davis (born 1970), English actor
Warwick Deacock (1926–2017), British soldier, mountaineer and adventurer
Warwick Draper (born 1976), Australian slalom canoeist
Warwick Fairfax (born 1960), Australian businessman, son of Warwick Oswald Fairfax
Warwick Fleury, New Zealand sailor
Warwick Fox (born 1954), Australian philosopher and ethicist
Warwick Freeman (born 1953), New Zealand jeweller
Warwick Fyfe (born 1969), Australian operatic baritone
Warwick Goble (1862–1943), British illustrator of children's books
Warwick Green (born 1966), Australian rules footballer
 Warwick Gould (born 1947), Australian literary scholar
Warwick Hele (1568–1626), English landowner and politician
Warwick Henderson (born 1953), New Zealand gallerist and art collector
Warwick Hough (1836–1915), Justice of the Supreme Court of Missouri
Warwick Irwin (born 1952), Australian rules footballer
Warwick Lightfoot, British politician, economist, and political adviser
Warwick McKibbin (born 1957), Australian economist
Warwick Moss (born 1947), Australian actor and television personality
Warwick Murray (born 1972), New Zealand academic, educationalist and musician
Warwick Nightingale (1956–1996), English guitarist and founder of the Sex Pistols
Warwick Oswald Fairfax (1901–1987), Australian businessman, philanthropist, journalist and playwright
Warwick Rimmer (born 1941), English football player and coach
Warwick Rodwell (born 1946), English archaeologist, architectural historian and academic
Warwick Saupold (born 1990), Australian professional baseball pitcher
Warwick Smith (disambiguation) – multiple people
Warwick Snedden (1920–1990), New Zealand cricketer
Warwick Stevenson (born 1980), Australian bicycle motocross racer 
Warwick Taylor (born 1960), New Zealand rugby union player
Warwick Thornton, Australian film director, screenwriter and cinematographer
Warwick Tidy (born 1953), English cricketer
Warwick Tucker, Australian mathematician
Warwick Ward (1891–1967), English actor and film producer
Warwick Waugh (born 1968), Australia rugby union team player
Warwick Wright (born 1946), New Zealand field hockey player 
Warwick Yates (born 1951), Australian rules footballer

Fictional character 
Warwick, the Uncaged Wrath of Zaun, a playable champion character in the Multiplayer Online Battle Arena video game League of Legends

References